The National Museum of Colombia is the National Museum of Colombia housing collections on its history, art, culture. Located in Bogotá downtown, is the biggest and oldest museum in Colombia. The National Museum of Colombia is a dependency of the Colombian Ministry of Culture.

The National Museum is the oldest in the country and one of the oldest in the continent, built in 1823. Its fortress architecture is built in stone and brick. The plant includes arches, domes and columns forming a sort of Greek cross over which 104 prison cells are distributed, with solid wall façade. It was known as the Panóptico (inspired by the Panopticon prison) and served as a prison until 1946. In 1948, the building was adapted for National Museum and restored in 1975. 

The museum houses a collection of over 20,000 pieces including works of art and objects representing different national history periods. Permanent exhibitions present archeology and ethnography samples from Colombian artefacts dating 10,000 years BC, up to twentieth century indigenous and afro- Colombian art and culture. Founders and New Kingdom of Granada room houses Liberators and other Spanish iconography; the round room exhibits a series of oleos from Colombia painting history.

Paintings by masters Débora Arango, Fernando Botero, Enrique Grau, Ignacio Gomez Jaramillo, Santiago Martinez Delgado, Alejandro Obregón, Omar Rayo, Andrés de Santa María, and Guillermo Wiedemann are part of the Permanent Collection.

Exhibitions 
 The Chinese Terracotta Army was displayed in 2006, with seven full statues and several other objects and parts

See also 

 Gold Museum

References

External links 

 

Museums established in 1823
History museums in Colombia
National Museum
Museums in Bogotá
National museums
Art museums and galleries in Colombia
1823 establishments in Gran Colombia